Parliamentary elections were held in Cape Verde on 7 December 1980. The country was a one-party state at the time, with the African Party for the Independence of Guinea and Cape Verde (PAIGC) as the sole legal party. Its leader was Aristides Pereira. The PAIGC presented a list of 63 candidates and three substitutes to voters to approve.

Results

References

Cape Verde
Elections in Cape Verde
1980 in Cape Verde
One-party elections
Single-candidate elections
December 1980 events in Africa